Amphimallon seidlitzi is a species of beetle in the Melolonthinae subfamily that can be found in Portugal and Spain.

References

Beetles described in 1891
seidlitzi
Beetles of Europe